Éducation de Prince (English: Education of a Prince) was a silent French film released in 1927. The French title has been spelled slightly differently over the years.

It was adapted by the director Henri Diamant-Berger from the play by Maurice Donnay. The known cast included Edna Purviance, Pierre Batcheff, and Jean Dax. This was Purviance's last film before retiring in 1928.

In 1938, Alexander Esway directed a remake, with adaptation and screenplay written by Henri-Georges Clouzot, released as Bargekeeper's Daughter.

Cast
Pierre Batcheff    
Pauline Carton    
Albert Préjean    
Armand Bernard    
Jean Dax    
Jean Joffre   
Jim Gérald    
Fernand Mailly    
Betove    
Andrews Engelmann    
Flora le Breton    
Edna Purviance

References

External links
 
 Education of a Prince at SilentEra
 

French silent films
1927 films
French black-and-white films
French comedy films
1927 comedy films
Films directed by Henri Diamant-Berger
Silent comedy films
1920s French films